The men's high jump event at the 2021 European Athletics Indoor Championships was held on 4 March at 19:00 (qualification) and 7 March at 11:25 (final) local time.

Medalists

Records

Results

Qualification
Qualification: Qualifying performance 2.28 (Q) or at least 8 best performers (q) advance to the Final.

Final

References

2021 European Athletics Indoor Championships
High jump at the European Athletics Indoor Championships